The following is the standings of the 3rd Division's 2010/11 football season started from 15 October 2010 and ended on 15 Juni, 2011. This is the 4th rated football competition in Iran after the Azadegan League, Persian Gulf Cup and 2nd Division.

Teams
In total, 70 teams will compete in 6 groups. From the First Round 12 teams go through the Second Round.

Group 1

Group 3

Group 5

Group 2

Group 4

Group 6

First Round (standings)

Group 1

Group 2

Group 3

Group 4

Group 5

Group 6

Second Round (standings)

Group A

Group B

Final

Championship final
The first leg to be played on 14 June 2011; the return leg to be played on 21 June 2011

Third place play-off
The single match to be played on 14 June 2011

Promotion play-off
The first legs to be played on 13 June 2011; the return legs to be played on 19 June 2011

Gitipasand Isfahan Promoted to 2nd Division.

Almahdi Novin Hormozgan Promoted to 2nd Division.

Player statistics

Top scorers

References

Sources
 اعلام جدول رده بندی مسابقات لیگ دسته سوم
 جدول رده بندی لیگ دسته کشور
 جدول رده بندی نهایی مسابقات لیگ دسته سوم در گروههای یک ، دو و شش
 جدول رده بنده نهایی مرحله اول لیگ دسته 3

League 3 (Iran) seasons
4